The 2020–21 season was the 84th season in the existence of RCD Mallorca and the club's fourth consecutive season in the top flight of Spanish football. In addition to the domestic league, Mallorca participated in this season's editions of the Copa del Rey and the UEFA Intertoto Cup. The season covers the period from 1 July 2000 to 30 June 2001.

Players

First-team squad

Transfers

In

Out

Competitions

Overview

La Liga

League table

Results summary

Results by round

Matches

Copa del Rey

Eightfinals

Quarterfinals

UEFA Intertoto Cup

Second round

Statistics

Players statistics

Goalscorers

References

External links

RCD Mallorca seasons
Mallorca